Montemaggiore Belsito (Sicilian: Muntimaiuri) is a small town and comune in the Metropolitan City of Palermo, Sicily, Southern Italy.

Slightly damaged by several earthquakes, there are several churches and a palace. The village is crossed by a main road that links many others villages (Alia, Aliminusa, Cerda) to highways A19 and A20. A northern portion of the road is still used for the Targa Florio, one of the oldest car races, as well as now a rally course.

References

External links 
 Official website

Municipalities of the Metropolitan City of Palermo